Wolfgang Stöhr (born August 26, 1946) was an East German ski jumper who competed from 1966 to 1971. He finished seventh in the individual large hill event at the 1968 Winter Olympics in Grenoble.

Stöhr's best individual finish was eighth in the individual normal hill event in Austria in 1968.

External links

Wolfgang Stöhr's profile at Sports Reference.com

Ski jumpers at the 1968 Winter Olympics
German male ski jumpers
Living people
1946 births
Olympic ski jumpers of East Germany